Giancarlo Berardi (born 15 November 1949) is an Italian comic book writer. Born in Genoa, he is most famous as creator of comics Ken Parker (1977) and Julia (1998).

External links
 A short biography of Giancarlo Berardi

1949 births
Italian comics writers
Living people
Writers from Genoa
20th-century Italian male writers